Spartium junceum, known as Spanish broom, rush broom, or weaver's broom, it is a species of flowering plant in the family Fabaceae and the sole species in the genus Spartium. It is closely related to the other brooms (in the genera Cytisus and Genista).

Description 
The leaves are of little importance to the plant, with much of the photosynthesis occurring in the green shoots (a water-conserving strategy in its dry climate). The leaves fall away early. In late spring and summer shoots are covered in profuse fragrant yellow pea-like flowers 1 to 2 cm across. They burst open, often with an audible crack, spreading seed from the parent plant.

Taxonomy 
The Greek name Spartium given to the genus denotes the use of the plant for 'cordage'. The Latin specific epithet junceum means "rush-like", referring to the shoots, which show a passing resemblance to those of the rush genus Juncus.

Distribution and habitat
This species is native to the Mediterranean in southern Europe, southwest Asia and northwest Africa, where it is found in sunny sites, usually on dry, sandy soils.

As an invasive species 
Spartium junceum has been widely introduced into other areas, and is regarded as a noxious invasive species in places with a Mediterranean climate such as California and Oregon, Hawaii, central Chile, southeastern Australia, the Western Cape in South Africa and the Canary Islands and Azores. It was first introduced to California as an ornamental plant.

Uses 
The plant is used as an ornamental plant in gardens and in landscape plantings. It has gained the Royal Horticultural Society's Award of Garden Merit. 

In Bolivia and Peru, the plant is known as retama, (not to be confused with the genus Retama) and has become very well established in some areas. It is one of the most common ornamental plants, often seen growing along sidewalks in La Paz.

Retama has made its way into the ethnobotany of the indigenous Aymara and Quechua cultures.

The plant is also used as a flavoring, and for its essential oil, known as genet absolute. Its fibers have been used for cloth and it produces a yellow dye.

Gallery

References

Genisteae
Monotypic Fabaceae genera
Flora of Western Asia
Flora of North Africa
Garden plants of Europe
Taxa named by Carl Linnaeus